Hart's Woods is a small forest located in Perinton, New York.  It contains a pristine stand of beech-maple forest, which covered 47% of Perinton prior to settlement. This type of forest with two dominant tree species thrives in areas of glacial till. The  site was declared a National Natural Landmark in June 1972.

Hart's Woods is open to the public for hiking on its trail system. It is operated by the Town of Perinton Recreation and Parks Department.

See also
List of National Natural Landmarks in New York

References

Perinton, New York
Forests of New York (state)
National Natural Landmarks in New York (state)
Parks in Monroe County, New York